Mount Olivet Cemetery is a cemetery in Salt Lake City, Utah. It was established on May 16, 1874, by an act of the U.S. Congress which granted 20 acres of land for public use as a cemetery. The first use of the cemetery was in 1877. The cemetery land originally consisted of exactly 20 acres  and was part of the U.S. Army's Camp Douglas military reservation. Since that time, the allotment has been expanded and contracted; the present cemetery is approximately 80 acres.

Notable burials
 Clarence Emir Allen (1852–1932), US Representative
 Jacob B. Blair (1821–1901), US Representative
 Arthur M. Brown (1843–1906), US Senator
 Ina Claire (1893–1985), actress
 George Dern (1872–1936), Governor of Utah
 Robert V. Derrah (1895–1946), architect
 William S. Godbe (1833–1903), journalist
 Elmer O. Leatherwood (1872–1929), US Representative
 J. Bracken Lee (1899–1996), Utah Governor
 James B. McKean (1821–1879), US Representative
 Charles C. Moore (1866–1958), Governor of Idaho
 Charles Eberhard Salomon (1824–1881), Civil War Union Brevet Brigadier General
 Frederick Salomon (1826–1897), Civil War Union Brigadier General
 John Smith (1931–1995), actor (cenotaph to Robert Errol Van Orden)
 Jabez G. Sutherland (1825–1902), US Representative
 Arthur Lloyd Thomas (1851–1924), Utah Territorial Governor
 John Witcher (1839–1906), Civil War Union Brevet Brigadier General

References

External links
 
 

1877 establishments in Utah Territory
Cemeteries in Utah